Virgil Munteanu (born July 10, 1988 in Drobeta-Turnu Severin) is an amateur Romanian Greco-Roman wrestler, who played for the men's featherweight category. He won the bronze medal for his division at the 2008 European Wrestling Championships in Tampere, Finland. He is also a member of CS Alro Slatina, and is coached and trained by Dinu Obrucea.

Munteanu represented Romania at the 2008 Summer Olympics in Beijing, where he competed for the men's 55 kg class. He received a bye for the second preliminary round, before losing out to U.S. wrestler and former world university champion Spenser Mango, with a technical score of 3–6.

References

External links
Profile – International Wrestling Database
NBC 2008 Olympics profile

1983 births
Living people
Olympic wrestlers of Romania
Wrestlers at the 2008 Summer Olympics
People from Drobeta-Turnu Severin
European Games competitors for Romania
Wrestlers at the 2015 European Games
Romanian male sport wrestlers
20th-century Romanian people
21st-century Romanian people